Android may refer to:

Science and technology
 Android (robot), a humanoid robot or synthetic organism designed to imitate a human
 Android (operating system), Google's mobile operating system
 The Android mascot
 Android (drug), a brand name for the synthetic hormone methyltestosterone

Arts and entertainment

Film
 Android Kunjappan Version 5.25, a 2019 film directed by Ratheesh Balakrishnan Poduval
 Android (film), a 1982 film directed by Aaron Lipstadt
 Android, the Russian title for the 2013 film App

Music
 The Androids, an Australian rock band
 "Android" (TVXQ song), 2012
 "Android", a song by Green Day from the album Kerplunk
 "Android", a song on The Prodigy's What Evil Lurks EP

Games
 Android (board game), published by Fantasy Flight Games

Other uses in arts and entertainment
 The Android (DC Comics), character
 The Android (novel), by K. A. Applegate
 Android 17, a character from the Dragon Ball franchise
 Android 18, a character from the Dragon Ball franchise

See also

 
 
 Androyd, a brand name of oxymetholone 
 Gynoid
 Cyborg
 Robot
 Droid (disambiguation)
 Metalmen (disambiguation)
 Robot (disambiguation)
 Robotman (disambiguation)